David Penna (January 11, 1958 – January 13, 2004) was an American jockey in thoroughbred horse racing who competed in the United States but had his greatest successes in Canada.

Born in Auburn, New York, he began his career as a professional rider in 1978 and three years later went to compete at Woodbine Racetrack in Toronto. In a career that spanned nineteen years, from 12,527 mounts he had 1,772 winners which earned purses totaling more than $39.5 million. Two of his most notable wins came in Canada's Triple Crown races.

One of the top riders in the 1980s and very popular with the Woodbine fans, Dave Penna rode primarily in Ontario at the Fort Erie Race Track in Fort Erie, and at Greenwood Raceway and Woodbine Racetrack, both in Toronto. In the 1990s, he began riding more frequently in the United States where he won important Graded stakes races at Keeneland Race Course in Kentucky and Gulfstream Park in Florida. In 1995 at Monmouth Park in New Jersey he won his last Grade I race,  the Philip H. Iselin Handicap. A racing accident resulted in an injury that forced Penna to retire in 1996 and for a short time he turned to training horses at Gulfstream Park.

In 2004, Dave Penna died at age 46 in Saanich, British Columbia.

References

1957 births
2004 deaths
Canadian jockeys
American jockeys
Sportspeople from Auburn, New York